Niklas Nordgren (born 4 May 2000) is a Finnish professional ice hockey Forward who currently plays as a right wing for Lahti Pelicans of the Finnish Liiga.

Playing career
He represented Finland in the 2018 IIHF World U18 Championships where he won the gold medal, scoring the game-winning goal in the gold medal game on a shorthanded breakaway with Jesperi Kotkaniemi's assistance.

Nordgren was projected as a top eligible draft pick for the 2018 NHL Entry Draft, and was drafted by the Chicago Blackhawks in the third round, 74th overall.

Having left HIFK on an initial loan move during the 2020–21 season to Lahti Pelicans, Nordgren's tenure with the Pelicans was made permanent in the off-season after signing a two-year contract extension on 20 May 2021.

Career statistics

Regular season and playoffs

International

References

External links

2000 births
Living people
Chicago Blackhawks draft picks
Finnish ice hockey right wingers
Ice hockey people from Helsinki
HIFK (ice hockey) players
Ice hockey players at the 2016 Winter Youth Olympics
Lahti Pelicans players
Peliitat Heinola players